Christ Missionary and Industrial College (CM&I), originally Christ Holiness School, is a historic parochial school in Jackson, Mississippi. It serves African American students.

The school mascot is a crusader and the school colors are royal blue and white. Sports teams at the school include baseball, basketball, and football.

A historical marker erected in 1992 commemorates the school's history.

G. G. Mosley served as principal of the school. Chas. P. Jones was principal in 1922.

In 2020 the school was vandalized. Buildings on the campus were damaged by a February 2021 ice storm.

Willenham Castilla graduated from the school.

See also
List of private schools in Mississippi

References

Christian schools in Mississippi
Historically black Christian schools
Christian elementary and primary schools
Christian high schools and secondary schools
Schools in Jackson, Mississippi
Education segregation in Mississippi
1897 establishments in Mississippi
Educational institutions established in 1897
1908 establishments in Mississippi
Educational institutions established in 1908